Torus mandibularis is a bony growth in the mandible along the surface nearest to the tongue. Mandibular tori are usually present near the premolars and above the location of the mylohyoid muscle's attachment to the mandible. In 90% of cases, there is a torus on both the left and right sides.

The prevalence of mandibular tori ranges from 5-40%. It is less common than bony growths occurring on the palate, known as torus palatinus. Mandibular tori are more common in Asian and Inuit populations, and slightly more common in males. In the United States, the prevalence is 7-10% of the population.

It is believed that mandibular tori are caused by several factors. They are more common in early adulthood and are associated with bruxism. The size of the tori may fluctuate throughout life, and in some cases the tori can be large enough to touch each other in the midline of mouth. Consequently, it is believed that mandibular tori are the result of local stresses and not due solely to genetic influences.

Mandibular tori are usually a clinical finding with no treatment necessary. It is possible for ulcers to form in the area of the tori due to trauma. The tori may also complicate the fabrication of dentures. If removal of the tori is needed, surgery can be done to reduce the amount of bone, but the tori may reform in cases where nearby teeth still receive local stresses.

References

External links 
 
 

Jaw disorders